Harrowby may refer to:

Earl of Harrowby, in the County of Lincoln, is a title in the Peerage of the United Kingdom
Nathaniel Ryder, 1st Baron Harrowby (1735–1803)
Dudley Ryder, 1st Earl of Harrowby, PC, FSA (1762–1847)
Dudley Ryder, 2nd Earl of Harrowby KG, PC, FRS (1798–1882)
Dudley Ryder, 3rd Earl of Harrowby PC, DL, JP (1831–1900)
Henry Ryder, 4th Earl of Harrowby (1836–1900)
John Ryder, 5th Earl of Harrowby (1864–1956)
Dudley Ryder, 6th Earl of Harrowby (1892–1987)
Dudley Ryder, 7th Earl of Harrowby (1922–2007)
Dudley Ryder, 8th Earl of Harrowby (born 1951)
Harrowby Hall in Lincolnshire, England, was the family home of the Ryder family, the former home of Nathaniel Ryder
Harrowby, Lincolnshire, England, a hamlet